Adolph Lowe (born Adolf Löwe; 4 March 1893  – 3 June 1995) was a German sociologist and economist. His best known student was Robert Heilbroner. He was born in Stuttgart and died in Wolfenbüttel.

Major publications of Adolph Lowe 

Arbeitslosigkeit und Kriminalität, 1914. 
"Zur Methode der Kriegswirtschaftsgesetzgebung", 1915, Die Hilfe 
"Die freie Konkurrenz", 1915, Die Hilfe 
Wirtschaftliche Demobilisierung, 1916. 
"Mitteleuropäische Demobilisierung", 1917, Wirtschaftszeitung der Zentralmächte. 
"Die ausführende Gewalt in der Ernährungspolitik", 1917, Europäische Staats- und Wirtschaftszeitung 
"Die Massenpreisung im System der Volksernährung", 1917, Europäische Staats- und Wirtschaftszeitung 
"Die Fragen der Übergangswirtschaft", 1918, Die Woche 
"Die Arbeiter- und Soldatenräte in der Demobilmachung", 1919, Europäische Staats- und Wirtschaftszeitung 
"Die Neue Demokratie", 1919, Der Spiegel 
"Die Soziologie des modernen Judentums", 1920, Der Spiegel 
"Zur gegenwartige Stand der Konjukturforschung in Deutschland", 1925,in Bonn and Palyi, editors, Die Wirtschaftswissenshaft nach dem Kriege, 1925. 
"Chronik der Weltwirtschaft", 1925, WWA 
"Wie ist Konjunkturtheorie uberhaupt möglich?", 1926, WWA (transl. 1997, "How is Business Cycle Theory Possible at All?", Structural Change and Economic Dynamics) 
"Weitere Bemerkungen zur Konjunkturforschung", 1926, Wirtschaftdienst 
"Zur Möglichkeit der Konjukturtheorie: Antwort auf Frank Oppenheimer", 1927, WWA 
"Über den Einfluss monetärer Faktoren auf der Konjukturzyklus", 1928, in Diel, editor, Beiträge zur Wirstschaftstheorie 
"Kredit und Konjuktur", 1929, in Boese, editor, Wandlungen des Kapitalismus Auslandsanleihen 
"Reparationspolitik", 1930, Neue Blätter für den Sozialismus 
"Lohnabbau als Mittel der Krisenbekämpfung?", 1930, Neue Blätter für den Sozialismus  
"Der Sinn der Weltwirschaftskrise", 1931, Neue Blätter für den Sozialismus  
"Das gegenwartige Bildungsproblem der deutschen Universität", 1931, Die Erziehung 
"Über den Sinn und die Grenzen verstehender Nationalökonomie", 1932, WWA 
"Der Stand und die nächste Zukunft der Konjukturforschung in Deutschland", 1933, Festschrift fur Arthur Spiethoff 
"Some Theoretical Considerations of the Meaning of Trend", 1935, Proceedings Manchester Statistical Society Economics and Sociology: A plea for cooperation in the social sciences, 1935. 
"Economic Analysis and Social Structure", 1936, Manchester School. 
"The Social Productivity of Technical Improvements", 1937, Manchester School 
"The Task of Democratic Education: pre-Hitler Germany and England", 1937, Social Research The Price of Liberty: A German on contemporary Britain, 1937. 
"The Turn of the Boom", 1938, Manchester Statistical Society The Universities in Transformation, 1940. 
"A Reconsideration of the Law of Supply and Demand", 1942, Social Research. 
"The Trend in World Economics", 1944, American J of Econ and Sociology 
"On the Mechanistic Approach in Economics", 1951, Social Research. 
"A Structural Model of Production", 1952, Social Research 
"National Economic Planning", 1952, in Hanley, editor, Survey of Contemporary Economics 
"The Classical Theory of Economic Growth", 1954, Social Research. 
"Structural Analysis of Real Capital Formation", 1955, in Abramovitz, editor, Capital Formation and Economic Growth. 
"The Practical Uses of Theory: Comment", 1959, Social Research. 
"Wirtschaftstheorie - der nächtste Schritt", 1959, Hamburger Jahrbuch fur Wirtschafts und Gesellschaftspolitik On Economic Knowledge: Toward a science of political economics, 1965. 
"The Normative Roots of Economic Value",1967, in Hook, Human Values and Economic Policy. 
"Toward a Science of Political Economics", 1969, in Heilbroner, editor, Economic Means and Social Ends 
"Economic Means and Social Ends: A Rejoinder", 1969, in Heilbroner, editor, Economic Means and Social Ends 
"Toward a Science of Political Economics", 1970, in Phenomenology and Social Reality. 
"Adam Smith's System of Economic Growth", 1975, in Skinner and Wilson, editors, Essays on Adam Smith The Path of Economic Growth, 1976. 
"Prometheus Unbound: A new world in the making", 1978, in Spicker, editor, Organism, Medicine and Metaphysics 
"What is Evolutionary Economics? Remarks upon receipt of the Veblen-Commons Award", 1980, Journal of Economic Issues. 
"Is Economic Value Still a Problem?", 1981, Social Research 
"Is the Glass Half Full or Half Empty? A self-critique", 1982, Social Research. Has Freedom a Future?, 1988.

 Secondary sources 
 Will Lissner: "In memoriam: Adolph Lowe, 1893-1995 - economist", American Journal of Economics and Sociology, January 1996. 
 Claus-Dieter Krohn: Der Philosophische Ökonom. Zur intellektuellen Biographie Adolph Lowes. 240 Seiten, Mai 1996 
 Volker Caspari, Bertram Schefold: Franz Oppenheimer und Adolph Lowe. Zwei Wirtschaftswissenschaftler der Frankfurter Universität. 312 Seiten, 1996 
 Claus-Dieter Krohn: Vertreibung und Akkulturation deutscher Wirtschaftswissenschaftler nach 1933 am Beispiel A.L.s und der 'University in Exile' an der New School for Social Research in New York in: Der Exodus aus Nazideutschland und die Folgen. Jüdische Wissenschaftler im Exil'' Hg. Marianne Hassler, Attempto, Tübingen 1997

External links
 Biography at HET
Biography at School of Cooperative Individualism
 Archive holdings and short bio, State University of New York, Albany
 

1893 births
1995 deaths
German centenarians
German economists
Jewish emigrants from Nazi Germany to the United Kingdom
Jewish sociologists
Historians of economic thought
German sociologists
German male non-fiction writers
Men centenarians
Writers from Stuttgart